Harald Hauge (born 12 May 1984) is a Norwegian football defender.

Hauge hails from Frogner, and played youth football for Lillestrøm SK. He got three Norwegian Premier League games in 2003, without scoring. He was given a senior contract with Lillestrøm ahead of the 2004 season. However, before the season actually started, he was loaned out to Hønefoss BK in the Norwegian First Division. A second season on loan was considered, but in January 2005 he was recalled to Lillestrøm. However, he soon became injured.

Ahead of the 2006 season he joined Ull/Kisa . Here he joined his brother Frank Arne Hauge. Ahead of the 2009 season he went on to Flisbyen BK. Frank Arne Hauge became assistant coach.

References

1984 births
Living people
Norwegian footballers
Lillestrøm SK players
Hønefoss BK players
Ullensaker/Kisa IL players
People from Akershus
Eliteserien players
Association football defenders
Sportspeople from Viken (county)